Saidapet is a constituency of the legislative assembly of the Indian state of Tamil Nadu. It covers the city of Saidapet in Chennai district and forms a part of Chennai South constituency for elections to the Parliament of India. Its State Assembly Constituency number is 23. It is one of the 234 State Legislative Assembly Constituencies in Tamil Nadu, in India.

Madras State

Tamil Nadu

Election results

2021

2016

2011

2006

2001

1996

1991

1989

1984

1980

1977

1971

1967

1962

1957

1952

References 

 
2001 By-election

Assembly constituencies of Tamil Nadu
Chennai district